Tambja gabrielae is a species of sea slug, a dorid nudibranch, a marine gastropod mollusk in the family Polyceridae.

Distribution
This species is found in Sulawesi (Indonesia), Philippines and Papua New Guinea.

Description
Tambja gabrielae has bright yellow or orange spots on a dark green to almost black background.

References

 Pola M., Cervera J.L. & Gosliner T.M. (2006) Taxonomic revision and phylogenetic analysis of the genus Tambja Burn, 1962 (Mollusca, Nudibranchia, Polyceridae). Zoologica Scripta 35(5):491-530.

External links
Images of Tambja gabrielae
 

Polyceridae
Gastropods described in 2005